Ma Tau Wai Road is a main road in Kowloon City District, Kowloon, Hong Kong.

History
Named after Ma Tau Wai, Ma Tau Wai Road  The northern section was named after Ma Tau Chung as Ma Tau Chung Road. There is a new Kowloon City Road that connects to Kai Tak Tunnel (formerly known as Airport Tunnel).

Features
A Pak Tai Temple is located along Ma Tau Wai Road. Pak Tai temples are dedicated to Pak Tai ( "North Deity" in Cantonese). This one was built in 1929 and is managed by the Chinese Temples Committee.

The two stretches of Ma Tai Wai Road, formerly interconnected, were separated on 17 October 1965 with the northern stretch connected to Chatham Road North, and the southern stretch to To Kwa Wan Road.

Collapse of building at 45 Ma Tau Wai Road (2010)

On 29 January 2010, Block J of 45 Ma Tau Wai Road, a rundown five-storey residential building, collapsed with little warning, resulting in the deaths of four people. The event took place at around 1:30pm. Renovation work was being carried out on the commercial unit located on the ground floor of the building, when construction workers noticed signs of an imminent collapse and rushed out to raise the alarm. It is speculated that the unauthorised renovation was the primary factor that led to the collapse of an already decaying and structurally weak building. Some of the residents were alerted by the commotion and evacuated seconds before the entire building caved in. A squad of fireman arrived at the scene just as the disaster unfolded, having received an emergency call from a passer-by prior to the collapse. Several hundred emergency workers were deployed in the ensuing rescue operation, which had to take place under adjacent buildings that were themselves subject to collapse at any moment. Temporary reinforcements were erected to support and stabilise the remaining structures to give added protection to the rescue teams.

The Chief Executive Donald Tsang later visited the site to inspect the rubble.

A repair order had been issued by the authorities months before, but at the time of the inspection, the extent of the symptoms did not indicate the gravity of the situation. The walk-up building, which was 55 years old, was the last block in a group of ten identical buildings. Residents in the adjoining blocks were subsequently relocated to temporary shelters in the immediate aftermath and then on to interim housing at public estates. This type of building is typical of many over the territory.

Implications and further action
The case was the first of its type in several decades, and raised new awareness amongst the public of the potential dangers faced by residents of such buildings. A thorough investigation into this particular incident, as well as a plan to prevent similar cases from occurring was ordered by the Government. The approximately four thousand buildings of the same classification that were constructed before 1960 were subsequently earmarked for inspection within one month.

The Urban Renewal Authority later announced development of the other blocks in the row. The project was later named “” and was finished in May 2020.

References

External links

 Antiquities Advisory Board. Pictures of the Pak Tai Temple
 Report on the Collapse of the Building at 45J Ma Tau Wai Road … on 29 January 2010, HKG Buildings Dept.

Roads in Kowloon
Ma Tau Wai